Calgary Islamic School, sometimes abbreviated as "CIS", is a school located in the north-east section of Calgary, Alberta. The school is attached to the Akram Jumu'a mosque (also known as the NE mosque), and teaches grades kindergarten through twelve, and has a daycare located within the school as well. There is also a Tahfeez, or memorization, program running within the school for those who wish to memorize the Qur'an, as well as complete their normal education. In addition to the academic curriculum, the school teaches Arabic, Qur'anic Studies, and Islamic Studies.

It was established in 1992.

References

External links
 Calgary Islamic School

High schools in Calgary
Middle schools in Calgary
Elementary schools in Calgary
Islamic schools in Canada
Private schools in Alberta
Educational institutions established in 1992
Schools in the Palliser Regional District
1992 establishments in Alberta